Ishwak Singh is an Indian actor who primarily works in Hindi films and television shows. He is best known for his roles in the series Paatal Lok (2020) and Rocket Boys (2022), for which he received nominations for the Filmfare OTT Awards.

Early life
Singh was born in New Delhi, India. He studied to be an architect, and ventured into acting by joining Asmita Theatre, a theatre group in Delhi.

Career
Singh made his screen debut with Raanjhanaa (2013) in a small role. He expanded into films with brief roles in the 2015 films Aligarh and Tamasha and had a bigger role in the romantic drama Tum Bin II (2016). He then played a supporting role opposite Sonam Kapoor in the comedy Veere Di Wedding (2018). In 2019, he played the  role of Aditya in Sanjay Leela Bhansali produced film Malaal which was directed by Mangesh Hadawale. The film starred Sharmin Segel and Meezaan Jafri in lead.

In 2020, Singh starred as a young, idealistic cop in the Amazon Prime Video crime thriller series Paatal Lok. Reviewing the series for The Indian Express , Shubhra Gupta labelled him as "impressive". Priyanka Roy of The Telegraph considered him to be "the find of the series". For which, he was nominated in the Filmfare OTT Awards for Best Supporting Actor in a Drama Series. The following year, he played a supporting role in Amazon Prime Video original film Unpaused (2020).

In 2022, he portrayed Vikram Sarabhai in Sony LIV web series Rocket Boys, which was directed by Abhay Pannu. The Times of India while reviewing the show, gave a rating 3.5 out of 5 and stated that Jim Sarbh and Ishwak Singh’s show is a glowing tribute to India's scientific luminaries. Further, they also said that the show is captivating from the start. Journalist Anuj Kumar of The Hindu mentioned that the lead actors Jim Sarbh and Ishwak Singh head a fantastic ensemble cast that gloriously brings to life the achievements of the scientific community in launching India’s atomic and space programs.

Singh will next appear in the spy thriller film titled Berlin, alongside Aparshakti Khurana and Bas Karo Aunty alongside Mahima Makwana.

In the media 
Ishwak Singh ranked 18th in Times 50 Most Desirable Men List of 2020.

Filmography

Films

Television

Awards and nominations

References

External links
 

Indian male film actors
Male actors in Hindi cinema
21st-century Indian male actors
Living people
20th-century births
Year of birth uncertain